Stigler is a surname. Notable people with the surname include:

 Franz Stigler (1915–2008), Luftwaffe pilot who escorted an American bomber back to safety in 1943
 George Stigler (1911–1991), Nobel Prize–winning U.S. economist, associated with the Stigler Commission and Stigler diet; father of Stephen Stigler
 James W. Stigler, American psychologist, researcher, entrepreneur and author
 Michael Stigler (born 1992), American track and field athlete
 Stephen Stigler (born 1941), professor at the University of Chicago, known for Stigler's law of eponymy; son of George Stigler
 William G. Stigler (1891–1952), American politician in Oklahoma

Other uses
 Stigler, Oklahoma, a city Haskell County
 Stigler Regional Airport, owned by the city of Stigler
 Stigler Commission, convened in 1961 to study the measurement of inflation in the United States
 Stigler diet, an optimization problem regarding recommended dietary allowances (RDAs)
 Stigler's law of eponymy, which states that no scientific discovery is named after its original discoverer
 List of examples of Stigler's law

See also
 
 Stiegler, a surname
 Stig (disambiguation)